Kazuhiko Takai is a professor of applied chemistry at Okayama University and is the recipient of the 2013 Chemical Society of Japan Award for his work on the use of catalytic metals in synthesis reactions. He studied at Kyoto University with Hitosi Nozaki and at the University of California, Berkeley with Clayton Heathcock.

References 

Year of birth missing (living people)
Living people
Japanese chemists